Jani Petteri Forsell (born 16 October 1990) is a Finnish professional footballer who plays as an attacking midfielder for Inter Turku. He made ten appearances scoring one goal for the Finland national team between 2013 and 2019.

Career
After starting his career with the local KPV, Forsell was signed by a near Veikkausliiga side VPS in 2009. After struggling to make it in the match squads at Vaasa, he left after only one season, switching to a fellow Veikkausliiga side, IFK Mariehamn. At Mariehamn, he began appear more regularly and soon attracted the attention of much bigger clubs in and outside of Finland. On 9 August 2012, he was selected as the player of the month, for July.

On 5 August 2012, it was announced that Forsell had signed with Süper Lig club Bursaspor. He was handed the number #7 shirt, for the upcoming season. Forsell made his debut for Bursaspor as a substitute on 23 August in a Europa League qualifying match against FC Twente.

Forsell was selected as the Ekstraklasa Player of the Month for September 2018. Forsell was the first ever player from Miedź Legnica to win the award and the first player to win it in his rookie year.

On 10 August 2019, Forsell scored one and gave two assists in a 4–0 win against FC Lahti on his league debut for HJK.

On 21 February 2022, Forsell returned to Inter Turku for the 2022 season.

Career statistics
Scores and results list Finland's goal tally first, score column indicates score after each Forsell goal.

Honours

Individual
Veikkausliiga Team of the Year: 2021

References

External links
  
  
 
 

1990 births
Living people
People from Kokkola
Sportspeople from Central Ostrobothnia
Finnish footballers
Association football midfielders
Finland international footballers
Finland under-21 international footballers
Vaasan Palloseura players
IFK Mariehamn players
Bursaspor footballers
Miedź Legnica players
Korona Kielce players
Kokkolan Palloveikot players
Örebro SK players
Helsingin Jalkapalloklubi players
Stal Mielec players
FC Inter Turku players
Veikkausliiga players
Allsvenskan players
Süper Lig players
Ekstraklasa players
I liga players
Finnish expatriate footballers
Finnish expatriate sportspeople in Poland
Expatriate footballers in Poland
Finnish expatriate sportspeople in Sweden
Expatriate footballers in Sweden
Finnish expatriate sportspeople in Turkey
Expatriate footballers in Turkey